Indonesia was the host nation of 2018 Asian Games held in Jakarta and Palembang from 18 August to 2 September 2018. Indonesia competed with 938 athletes, the most in the Games.

Vice President of Indonesia Jusuf Kalla assigned the then-National Police Deputy Chief Commissioner General Syafruddin as chef de mission for the Indonesian contingent.

Competitors 
The following is a list of the number of competitors representing Indonesia that participated at the Games:

Demonstration events

Medalists

The following Indonesia competitors won medals at the Games.

|  style="text-align:left; width:78%; vertical-align:top;"|

|  style="text-align:left; width:22%; vertical-align:top;"|

—

Demonstration sports medalists

eSports was featured at the 2018 Asian Games as a demonstration sport, meaning medals won in this sport will not be counted in the official overall medal tally. It was held from 26 August to 1 September. Six video game titles were featured in the demonstration event. Indonesia collected 2 medals, 1 gold and 1 silver, and finished second in the table.

The following Indonesia competitors won medals at the demonstration games.

|  style="text-align:left; width:78%; vertical-align:top;"|

Archery

Recurve

Compound

Artistic swimming 

* Did not play.

Athletics

Badminton 

Indonesia announced its squad of 20 players (10 men's and 10 women's) on 30 June 2018.

Men

Women

Mixed

Baseball

Indonesia sent a men's team to make its debut in the baseball competition at the Asian Games. The team were drawn in the group B alongside Hong Kong, South Korea and  Chinese Taipei.

Roster
The following is the Indonesia roster for the men's baseball tournament of the 2018 Asian Games.

Round 2 – Group B

Consolation round

Basketball 

Summary

5x5 basketball
Indonesia men's and women's basketball team entered the competition, drawn in group A for the men's and in group X for the women's.

Men's tournament

Roster
The following is the Indonesia roster in the men's basketball tournament of the 2018 Asian Games.

Group A

Quarter-final

Classification 5th–8th

Seventh place game

Women's tournament

Roster
The following is the Indonesia roster in the women's basketball tournament of the 2018 Asian Games.

Group X

Quarter-final

Classification 5th–8th

Seventh place game

3x3 basketball
Indonesia national 3x3 team will participate in the Games. The men's team placed in pool B and the women's team in pool D based on the FIBA 3x3 federation ranking.

Men's tournament

Roster
The following is the Indonesia roster in the men's 3x3 basketball tournament of the 2018 Asian Games.
Erick Jonathan Gosal
Rivaldo Tandra Pangesthio
Vincent Rivaldi Kosasih
Agassi Yeshe Goantara

Pool A

Women's tournament

Roster
The following is the Indonesia roster in the women's 3x3 basketball tournament of the 2018 Asian Games.
Christine Apriyani Rumambi
Dewa Ayu Made Sriartha Kusuma
Delaya Maria
Ni Putu Eka Liana Febiananda

Pool D

Quarter-final

Bowling 

Men

Women

Boxing 

Men

Women

Canoeing

Slalom

Sprint

Qualification legend: QF=Final; QS=Semifinal

Traditional boat race 

Men

Women

Canoe polo (demonstration)

Contract bridge 

Men

Women

Mixed

Cycling

BMX

Mountain biking
Indonesia downhill bikers entered the competition with 4 athletes. Two men's athletes Popo Ario Sejati and Khoiful Muhkib was a national downhill champion, and for the women's athletes Nining Purwaningsih dan Tiara Andini Prastika was a second and third place at the 2017 Asian Mountain Biking Championships in Xuancheng, China.

Road

Track

Sprint

Team sprint

 Riders who entered the competition but did not participating in any phase of the team event.
Qualification legend: FA=Gold medal final; FB=Bronze medal final

Pursuit

 Riders who entered the competition but did not participating in any phase of the team event.
Qualification legend: FA=Gold medal final; FB=Bronze medal final

Keirin

Qualification legend: FA=Gold medal final; FB=Bronze medal final

Omnium

Madison

Diving 

Men

Women

Equestrian 

Dressage

Eventing

Jumping

 – indicates that the score of this rider does not count in the team competition, since only the best three results of a team are counted.

Esports (demonstration) 

Arena of Valor and Clash Royale

Hearthstone and StarCraft II

League of Legends and Pro Evolution Soccer

Fencing 

Individual

Team

Field hockey 

As the host nation, Indonesia was given a spot to compete in both men's and women's tournaments, both teams were placed in the group A and B respectively.

Summary

Men's tournament 

Roster

Pool A

Ninth place game

Women's tournament 

Roster

Pool B

Seventh place game

Football 

As the host nation, Indonesia men's and women's team were drawn in Group A respectively.

Summary

Men's tournament 

Roster

Group A

Round of 16

Women's tournament 

Roster

Group A

Golf 

Men

Women

Gymnastics

Handball 

Indonesia men's handball team drawn in group C at the Games, while the women's team in group B.

Summary

Men's tournament

Roster

Nur Rahman Effendi
Andi Yoga Ananda
Fitra Agung Aditya Pratama
Oni Arianus Sir
Yulianto Effendi Sir
Bagas
Rufan Pujianto
Viktorius Rafael Tobing
Alias Ilyas
Harun Nurrasyid
Saepul Rahman
Muhammad Aryasatya Hidayat Noor
Moch. Phasa Nurfauzan
Rian Kurniawan
Dupa Gilang Pratama Wiguna
Risky Fidelano

Group C

Classification round

Women's tournament

Roster

Shantika Ayuning Baharizki
Fitri Anggi Yani
Claudia Finka Wiranata
Inge Indah Wijayatri
Dian Ekavianti Fefan
M. Shinta Hidayatuzzaroh
Lia Apriliani
Ria Astuti
Marselina
Afifatur Rofidiyah
Putri Dwi Merdekawati
Gadis Risma Septiananda
Sri Nurlinda
Anggun Pramesti
Felita Widya Dhana
Anisa Yulianti

Group B

5–8th place semifinals

Seventh place game

Jet ski 

Indonesia entered three jet skiers at the Games, with two gold medals targeted by the government.

Ju-jitsu 

Men

Women

Judo 

Men

Women

Mixed

Kabaddi

Summary

Men's tournament

Team roster

I Gede Feri Setiawan
I Ketut Sudita
I Made Arya Negara
I Wayan Halus Suandana
Dicki Candra
Ida Bagus Ketut Wipradana
I Komang Dandy Darmawan
Faisal Ihsan Kamil
Setya Yogasena
Aldino Indrayana
I Putu Wahyu Juniartha
I Nyoman Tos Pasek Wiguna

Group B

Women's tournament

Team roster

Komang Ariningsih
Ni Kadek Amiariasti
Ni Putu Dewi Laraswati
Ni Kadek Ernawati
Desak Gede Indah Vinda D
I Gusti Anak Agung Pradnyawati
Ni Komang Isna Pratiwi
Ni Ketut Puspasari
Agustina Siregar
Kadek Candra Wahyuni
Kadek Surya Febriantari
Ni Made Praarthini Samitha

Group A

Karate 

Indonesia prepared a team that will participate in the karate competition. The National Karate Federation (FORKI) selected eight karate practitioners (4 men's and 4 women's) for the Games.

Kurash 

Men

Women

Modern pentathlon 

Modern Pentathton Indonesia (MPI) announced four pentathletes to compete at the Games.

Paragliding 

Men

Women

Pencak silat 

Ikatan Pencak Silat Indonesia (IPSI) sent 22 athletes to compete at the Games. 12 athletes (6 men's and 6 women's) competed in the seni events, while 10 athletes (7 men's and 3 women's) in the tanding events.

Seni

Tanding

Roller sports 

Indonesia entered the skateboarding event at the Games with 6 athletes (4 men's and 2 women's), while 4 athletes (2 men's and 2 women's) participated in the speed skating event.

Skateboarding

Speed skating

Rowing 

Men

Women

Rugby Sevens 

Indonesia men's and women's team participated in the Games in Group B of the tournament respectively. Persatuan Rugby Union Indonesia (PRUI) announced its squad of 24 athletes (12 men's and 12 women's) on 6 August.

Men's tournament

Squad
The following is the Indonesia squad in the men's rugby sevens tournament of the 2018 Asian Games.

Head coach:  George Dennis Wilson

Nanda Septian Oloan Siregar
Handika Hadi Wibowo
Fransiscus Lohtar Matius Sinaga
Yusuf Satria Nugroho Bagong Putra
Aqiel Azis Safrurrozi
Buldan Muhammad Abdurrohman
Lawrence Oiyaitou
Dionysius Oktavian Andi Pratikno
Christopher Adhitya Hardwika
Muhammad Rifaldi
Andika Yudistira Pratama
Muhammad Danial Al Fikri

Group B

Classification round (9–12)

Women's tournament

Squad
The following is the Indonesia squad in the women's rugby sevens tournament of the 2018 Asian Games. Based on the squad released by PRUI, Ester Christiani Sitompul replaced by Regina Fetowin.

Head coach:  George Dennis Wilson

Regina Fetowin
Fevi Susanti
Pipit Ayu Lestari
Nadya Silvy Khoirunnisa
Lesly Adriana Deda
Dian Wahyu Saputri
Fanny Givllia Gara Sati
Tri Sukma Nugraeni
Indri Katerina Lahu
Yesi Oktasari
Veronika Adriana Olua
Serli Angganice Matindas

Group B

Quarterfinal

Classification semifinal (5–8)

Seventh place game

Sailing

Men

Women

Mixed

Sambo

Sepak takraw 

Men

Women

Shooting 

Men

Women

Mixed team

Soft tennis

Softball 

Summary

Roster

Dian Agustina
Delin
Agustina Diadiaway
Cresida Mariska Dwiyanti
Ilka Arunia Emogene
Febina Fitriani
Gisza Gabriella
Monica Isella
Steffaney Angelica Johanna
Lidia Anna Krey
Adhisty Deynira Nuranjani
Vinny Anugerah Dwi Putri
Syehan Hana Rahmania
Yuka Ramadina
Ashilla Safiya
Wa Ode Sitti Saputriani
Adelaide Tania Waromi

Preliminary round
The top four teams will advance to the Final round.

Sport climbing 

Speed

Speed relay

Combined

Squash 

Singles

Team

Swimming

Men

Women

Mixed

Table tennis 

Individual

Team

Taekwondo

Pengurus Besar Taekwondo Indonesia (PBTI) entered their athletes into the taekwondo competition at the Games. The last medals won by Indonesia in taekwondo competition at the Asian Games was in 2010 Guangzhou, and this year, PBTI target a gold medal.

Poomsae

Kyorugi

Tennis 

Men

Women

Mixed

Triathlon 

Indonesian Triathlon Federation entered six triathletes (3 men's and 3 women's) to compete at the Games.

Individual

Mixed relay

Volleyball

Beach volleyball

Indoor volleyball

Men's tournament

Team roster
The following is the Indonesia roster in the men's volleyball tournament of the 2018 Asian Games. 

Head coach: Samsul Jais

Pool A

Playoff

Quarterfinal

5th place game

Women's tournament

Team roster
The following is the Indonesian roster in the women's volleyball tournament of the 2018 Asian Games. 

Head coach: Mohamad Amsori

Pool A

Quarterfinal

5–8th place semifinals

Seventh place game

Water polo 

Summary

Men's tournament

Team roster
Head coach:  Milos Sakovic

Mochammad Rafi Alfariz (GK)
Beby Tarigan (CB)
M Hamid Firdaus (D)
Silvester Manik (D)
Erlangga Andaru Rinaldi (D)
Andi Muhammad Uwayzulqarni (D)
Yusuf Budiman (CF)
Reza Auditya Putra (D) (C)
Delvin Felliciano (CF)
Ridjkie Mulia (D)
Rian Rinaldo (D)
Zaenal Arifin (CB)
Novian Dwi Putra (GK)

Group B

Quarter-final

Classification semifinal (5–8)

Seventh place game

Women's tournament

Team roster
Head coach:  Zoran Kontic

Ayudya Suidarwanty Pratiwi (GK)
Sarah Manzilina (CF)
Alya Nadira Trifiansyah (D)
Hanna Firdaus (D)
Ivy Nernie Priscilla (CB)
Nyoman Ayu Savitri Arsana (D)
Upiet Sarumanah (CF)
Ariel Dyah Cininta Siwabessy (D) (C)
Glindra Patricia Legawa (D)
Febrika Indirawati (CB)
Rani Raida (D)
Siti Balkis (CF)
Dinda Nur Asmarandana (GK)

Round robin

Weightlifting

All Indonesia Weightlifting, Bodybuilding & Powerlifting Association prepared 13 weightlifters (7 men's and 6 women's) including three Olympics medalists to compete at the Games.

Men

Women

Wrestling 

Men's freestyle

Men's Greco-Roman

Women's freestyle

Wushu 

Taolu

Sanda

Key: * TV – Technical victory.

See also 
 Indonesia at the 2018 Asian Para Games

References 

Nations at the 2018 Asian Games
2018
Asian Games